Cunetio was a large walled town in a valley of the River Kennet in modern-day Wiltshire, England. The settlement was occupied from the 2nd century CE by Romano-British people until the post-Roman period, and was abandoned in the early 5th century.

The entire town lay undiscovered until it was identified from aerial photos in the 1940s. Archaeological excavations have revealed that the town was a substantial urban area defended by large masonry walls. Artefacts recovered from the site include kitchenware, personal effects, and two hoards of Roman coinage.

History
 
The Cunetio site has been known since the 19th century, when local antiquarians conducted sporadic excavations. The full scale and importance of the site, however, was identified from aerial photos of crop marks taken in 1940, and the site has been sporadically excavated since the 1950s alongside the continuation of aerial photography to further map the site. In the 1960s, a small coin hoard was found, followed in 1978 by the much larger Cunetio Hoard of over 55,000 coins. The site was dug and geophysically surveyed in 2009 by Channel 4's archaeological television programme Time Team, which found many more coins and other objects.

The town grew around a mansio that had been built near the crossing of two Roman roads: the east–west road (Margary 53) from Speen in Berkshire to Aquae Sulis (Bath), and the south-east to north road (43) from Winchester to Wanborough. As the town grew, it developed a regular grid of streets and stone buildings on its eastern side but retained less regular and substantial structures in the west part.

The masonry walls ran inside and parallel with the original defences on the east side but outside of them on the south and west sides. Excavations of the west gate show it was flanked by two towers and possibly had a set of iron-gates similar to a portcullis, because grooves were found in the remains of the towers' footings.

Archaeological examinations of the site do not reveal why Cunetio deserved so much expenditure on upgrading its defences, an act that was a rare occurrence for inland Britannia at the time, when most Roman military engineering projects were focused on the Saxon Shore forts. Two theories have been suggested: first that the town was being converted into a Legionary fortress to re-establish Roman authority in this part of the province of Britannia. Second, that the improvement work was being orchestrated by an ambitious local British governor – the type of man who would, within a generation or so, be setting himself up as a war-lord or regional chieftain. Interpretation therefore swings between the Roman Empire re-establishing its authority after various rebellions and uprisings, or Roman authority breaking down.

In the 3rd century, the town was a prosperous settlement, and by the start of the 4th, it had become a hub of villas. It has also been suggested that the town was reorganised as a centre of taxation, administration, and military functions later in the 4th century AD, coinciding with the addition of the defensive stone wall. However, the Roman withdrawal from Britain  410 caused Cunetio to rapidly decline in importance, until it was completely abandoned.

Notes

External links
Cunetio at roman-britain.co.uk
 Time Team episode on Cunetio – YouTube

Roman towns and cities in England
Archaeological sites in Wiltshire
Former populated places in Wiltshire